Nor'wester may refer to:

 Nor'wester (New Zealand), a New Zealand wind pattern
 Nor'wester (Bangladesh), a stormy weather pattern in India and Bangladesh occurring in the spring
 Nor'Wester Mountains, a group of mountains in Ontario, Canada
 Nor'wester, a novel by Clements Ripley
 The Nor'-westers, a 1954 book by Ion Idriess
 Daily Nor'Wester, original name of the Winnipeg Telegram
 Kalbaishakhi, nor-westors in Kolkata; see Geography of Kolkata
 Employees of the North West Company during the North American fur trade

See also
 Norwest (disambiguation)